Ross Wilson MBE (born 1958) is an artist from Northern Ireland. He studied Fine Art at the University of Ulster and at the Chelsea College of Art and Design and has been a visiting speaker at Harvard University and the University of Oxford. He currently resides and works in Northern Ireland.

In 1997 his first public sculpture commission in bronze (The Ulster Brewer) was placed at the Waterfront Hall, Belfast. He was commissioned for the centenary C. S. Lewis Sculpture in 1998, placed in east Belfast. His many portrait commissions have included Nobel Laureates Derek Walcott and Seamus Heaney, and the playwright Arthur Miller. His work is displayed across the world among several public and private collections.

In 2001 Wilson was invited by the Prince of Wales to join him for a dinner party at Hillsborough Castle. This catalysed the unique bond and friendship with Prince Charles, which flourished from then on in. Ross swapped paintings he had done of the Donegal based artist Derek Hill, who had been the Princes mentor and teacher in art throughout his life, this clearly struck a chord with the Prince as Ross was continually asked to spend weekends with him and others at Balmoral castle, the residence of the royal family 

Says Ross: “I was asked to bring my paints with me and I did some landscapes and snow-scapes over there. The Prince, who’s a very accomplished artist himself, liked some of my work, and to my surprise he offered to swap one of his paintings for one of mine. Which, of course, I agreed to do.”

He’s one of the most genuine people I’ve ever met and I think he’s misunderstood because the Press misrepresent him,” adds Ross, who met the Prince on a public stage last year during a Royal visit to the East Belfast Network Centre, which had transformed from an old school in Templemore Avenue with a grant from Charles’ Regeneration Trust. Truly transformational and radical conversations were said to have been had on his visits to Balmoral, and the friendship between the two men still stands.

Ross was then announced the High Sherriff of County Londonderry; the principal formal duties of High Sheriffs today are including the attendance and accompaniment at royal visits in the County and support for Her Majesty's High Court Judges when on Circuit.

Family

Ross is married to Elizabeth Wilson who studied fashion and textiles in Belfast, and has one daughter, Grace (born 2001) who pursued studies at Durham University.

Wilson mentioned in an article to the Belfast times, that his daughter, Grace, spoke of becoming an artist through her childhood,  "But I have tried to encourage her to concentrate on her talent as a musician," says Ross. "An artist's life is a difficult path."

References

Living people
1958 births
Artists from Northern Ireland
Sculptors from Northern Ireland
Alumni of Ulster University